Cosme is a given name and surname.  Notable people with the name include:

Given name
Cosme (footballer) (1927–2011), Spanish footballer 
Cosme Argerich (1758–1820), Argentinian military physician
Cosme Correa ( 1540s), Portuguese nobleman and colonizer of Bombay
Cosme Damián de Churruca y Elorza (1761–1805), Spanish nobleman and soldier
Cosme Damião (1885–1947), Portuguese football player and coach
Cosme de Torres (1510–1570), Spanish Jesuit missionary 
Cosme Delgado (died 1596), Portuguese Renaissance composer
Cosme García Sáez (1818–1874), Spanish inventor
Cosmé McMoon (1901–1980), American pianist and composer
Cosme Prenafeta (born 1971), Spanish volleyball player
Cosme Saavedra (1901–1967), Argentine cyclist
Cosme San Martín (died 1906), Chilean painter
Cosme Rivera (born 1976), Mexican  boxer
Cosme Torres Espinoza ( 2000s), Cuban diplomat
Cosmé Tura (1430–1495), Italian painter
Cosme de Villiers (1683–1758), French bibliographer

Surname
Eusebia Cosme (1908–1976), Afro-Cuban poetry reciter and actress
Fernando Nascimento Cosme (born 1983), Brazilian futsal player
Gilbert Cosme (born 1975), Puerto Rican wrestler better known by his ring names, El Mesías and Ricky Banderas
Laura Cosme (born 1992), Colombian footballer
Niccolo Cosme (born 1980), Filipino photographer
Pierre Cosme (born 1965), French historian
Wilberto Cosme (born 1984), Colombian professional footballer
Wilma Cosmé (born 1966), a Puerto Rican-American singer better known by her stage name Sa-Fire